Jordan Masterson (born April 9, 1986) is an American actor. He played Zeb, a five-year-old boy, in Danielle Steel's 1993 TV adaptation Star. He is perhaps best known for his role as Mark in the 2005 film The 40-Year-Old Virgin and his recurring role as Dumptruck in ABC Family comedy-drama series Greek.  He co-starred as Ryan Vogelson in Last Man Standing on ABC (2012–2017) and FOX (2018–2021).

He also guest starred in the television series Grounded for Life, George Lopez, Las Vegas, 7th Heaven, CSI: Miami, Without a Trace and How I Met Your Mother.

Masterson is the brother of actress Alanna Masterson and the maternal half-brother of actors Danny Masterson and Christopher Masterson. His cousin is Angus T. Jones.

Early life
Masterson was born on April 9, 1986 in Dunedin, Florida. His mother, Carol Masterson, is also his manager, and his father, Joe Reaiche, who is of Lebanese descent, is a former National Rugby League NRL Professional player.<ref 

He is the younger half-brother of actors Danny Masterson and Christopher Masterson. (He guest starred on both of his half-brothers' respective series, That '70s Show and Malcolm in the Middle.) He is the older brother of actress Alanna Masterson.

As a child, Masterson was active in baseball, tennis, and snowboarding.

Personal life
Along with his mother, sister, and half-brothers, Masterson is a member of the Church of Scientology.

He was previously in a long-term relationship with actress Dakota Johnson.

Filmography

References

External links

1986 births
Living people
20th-century American male actors
21st-century American male actors
Male actors from New York (state)
American male child actors
American male film actors
American male television actors
People from Long Island
American Scientologists
People from Dunedin, Florida
Masterson family